In financial analysis, a channel check is third-party research on a company's business based on collecting information from the distribution channels of the company. It may be conducted in order to value the company, to perform due diligence in various contexts, and the like. Industries where channel checks are more often conducted include retail, technology, commodities, etc.

It is a practice performed by third party researchers and financial analysts in order to collect information about a company's business. The Channel Check process includes interviewing people within other organizations connected to the company's supply and distribution channels. These interviews usually occur without the target company's knowledge. For example, a channel check could include one or multiple conversations with a store manager to understand their targeted customer. Analysts generally look for top products, customer buying patterns and past performance.

Analysts could also contact one or several suppliers or vendors to obtain information about the targeted company. In these interviews analysts are looking for quantity of materials being demanded and prices. Suppliers could also help Analysts to see the “Bigger Picture” of a company's production plans, new products and more. Suppliers may also give an indication of the raw material availability, finished product inventory levels, promotion plans to the Analysts.

Channel checks can give insights complementary to balance sheet analysis, such as distributor and retailer attitudes towards a product and its competitors, seasonal and geographic variation, inventory levels (notably channel stuffing), and so on.

See also
 
 Due diligence
 Standard of care
 Duty of care
 Business ethics

References

External links
 http://www.investopedia.com/terms/c/channelcheck.asp
 https://www.theatlantic.com/technology/archive/2010/11/whats-a-channel-check-anyway/67017/
 https://web.archive.org/web/20141010072000/http://www.gxsblogs.com/sampathp/2010/11/channel-check-where-supply-chains-meet-insider-trading.html

Valuation (finance)